Year 569 (DLXIX) was a common year starting on Tuesday (link will display the full calendar) of the Julian calendar. The denomination 569 for this year has been used since the early medieval period, when the Anno Domini calendar era became the prevalent method in Europe for naming years.

Events 
 By place 
 Byzantine Empire 
 Emperor Justin II and his wife Sophia send a relic of the "True Cross" to the Frankish princess Radegund, who has founded a monastery at Poitiers.
 The Garamantian Kingdom (modern Libya) signs a peace treaty with the Byzantine Empire. The capital city of Garama is converted to Christianity.

 Europe 
 September – The Lombards conquer Forum Iulii (Cividale del Friuli) in northeastern Italy. Later in the year, the Lombards conquer  Milan. 
 Gisulf I, nephew of Alboin, is appointed as the first duke of Friuli (approximate date).

 Arabia 
 Al-Mundhir III succeeds his father Al-Harith V and becomes king of the Ghassanids.

 By topic 
 Religion 
 The Nubian kingdom of Alodia is converted to Christianity by Byzantine missionaries (according to John of Ephesus).
 John of Ephesus completes his "Biographies of Eastern Saints" (approximate date).
 November 19 – In Poitiers the "Vexilla Regis" is first sung during the Procession.

Births 
 Yángdi, emperor of the Sui Dynasty (d. 618)

Deaths 
 Ainmuire mac Sétnai, High King of Ireland
 Al-Harith ibn Jabalah, king of the Ghassanids
 Peter IV, Coptic Orthodox patriarch of Alexandria
 Wu Cheng Di, emperor of Northern Qi (b. 537)

References